Joseph Ssali (26 December 1967 – 18 November 2003) was a Ugandan sprinter. He competed in the men's 100 metres at the 1988 Summer Olympics.

References

1967 births
2003 deaths
Athletes (track and field) at the 1988 Summer Olympics
Ugandan male sprinters
Olympic athletes of Uganda
Place of birth missing